The Pingshan power station is a large modern coal-fired power station in China. The power station is divided into two phases with phase one consisting of two 660 MW units both with scrubbing systems and cooling towers.  Phase two has one ultra-supercritical secondary reheat unit with a 1350 MW capacity. This unit is one of the single largest coal units in the world, it also has the worlds largest cooling tower with a height of 210 m (689 ft). 

The engineering and design works for the power station were completed by East China Institute of Energy. The Phase 2 unit has coal consumption rate of 251g/kWh.

See also 

 List of coal power stations

References

Coal-fired power stations in China